Paweł Piasecki (1579–1649) was the Royal Secretary of king Sigismund III Vasa (1613–1627); Catholic priest, canon, abbot, bishop of Kamieniec (1627–1640), bishop of Chełm (1640–1644), bishop of Przemyśl (1640–1649).

Author of Kronika Pawła Piaseckiego biskupa przemyślskiego. Polski przekład wedle dawnego rękopismu, poprzedzony studyjum krytyczném nad życiem i pismami autora 1870.

1579 births
1649 deaths
Bishops of Przemyśl
Abbots of Mogiła
Ecclesiastical senators of the Polish–Lithuanian Commonwealth
17th-century Polish historians
Polish male non-fiction writers
17th-century Polish Roman Catholic priests